Sharon Azrieli is a  soprano singer, and cantor from Montreal, Quebec. Azrieli performs classical, operatic, and musical theatre works, playing parts such as Juliette in Charles Gounod's Roméo et Juliette, Mimi in La Bohème and Susanna in Le Nozze di Figaro. She attended Juilliard and has performed with the Tokyo Symphony Orchestra, the Israel Chamber Orchestra and the Canadian Opera Company.

Early life and education
Azrieli was born in Montreal, Quebec to Canadian architect, philanthropist and Holocaust survivor, David Azrieli. Azrieli moved to New York City after attending Vassar College, where she graduated with a degree in Art History, and an Associate Degree in Illustration from the Parsons School of Design. While studying illustration she got a Diploma in Vocal Performance under Ellen Faull at the Juilliard School, where her mentors included Joan Dornemann, Principal Prompter at the Metropolitan Opera and the late Herbert Breslin. Joan Dornemann invited her to attend her Vocal Arts Institute in Israel over three successive summers where she performed several leading roles, including Norina in Don Pasquale and Musetta in La Boheme. In 2006, Azrieli obtained a Master of Music degree in Vocal Performance from the Université de Montréal, and then in 2011 a Doctorate in Music from the same university.

Early career
The Canadian Opera Company's artistic director, the late Richard Bradshaw, scouted Azrieli, starting her career as a professional opera singer. Bradshaw hired her as an understudy for the part of Juliet in a production of Gounod's Roméo et Juliette and as Mimi in a small-stage production of Puccini's La Bohème. Artist manager Matthew Laifer spotted Azrieli's performance and invited her to his roster. Under Lafier's management, she performed with the Tokyo Symphony Orchestra, the Israel Chamber Orchestra, the Jerusalem Symphony Orchestra and the Haifa Symphony Orchestra in their production of Rossini's Stabat Mater and Beethoven's Mass in C Minor. Other works included a concert of Puccini arias and Leonard Bernstein's Songfest. She also worked with Alexander Brott of McGill Chamber Orchestra, and understudied for Mirella Freni as Adrienne Lecouvreur with l'Opéra de Paris. A significant event in Azrieli's career came when she played the part of Susanna in Le nozze di Figaro at the Sarasota opera.

Cantorial work
Azrieli enrolled at the Academy for Jewish Religion in New York and began her first job as a Cantor for Temple Adas Israel in Sag Harbor. Azrieli and her sons moved back to Montreal in 2000, where she became a full-time cantor at Temple Emanu-El-Beth Sholom from 2001 until 2003. While completing her D. Mus. at the Université de Montréal in 2011, she wrote her thesis on ethnomusicological links between the music of Giuseppe Verdi and ancient Jewish scales/modes.

Sharon on Stage
Azrieli became a student of Bill Schuman, a teacher who had previously worked with Celine Dion and Aprille Millo and currently teaches at the Academy of Vocal Arts in Philadelphia. With Schuman's help, Azrieli primed her voice for Verdian soprano roles. Azrieli performed Leonora in Il trovatore and Aida. She performed the roles of the prioress in Dialogues des carmélites and Leonora in La Forza del Destino with One World Symphony Orchestra. Azrieli sang the role of La Gioconda in La Gioconda with the New Jersey Association of Verismo Opera and Mimi in "La Boheme" with the New Jersey Association and the Canadian Opera Company. She has performed at several major festivals, including Brott Music Festival in Hamilton, Ontario, and Festival Sefarad in Montreal.

Azrieli has, on numerous occasions, captured the eyes and ears of audiences at Carnegie Hall. Her first appearance at the world-renowned theatre was in April 1996 for the Altamura/Enrico Caruso International Voice Competition, in which she performed Francesco Cilea's Adriana Lecouvreur: Act I. Io son l'umile ancella. In 2016, She performed Gabriel Fauré’s Requiem, Op. 48 under conductor Alex Qian with the New England Symphonic Ensemble. In 2017 She performed twice at Carnegie Hall. Once in April, for the Opera Gala Honoring the Career of Tenor Giuseppe Giacomini under conductor Eve Queler and Members of the Opera Orchestra of New York. Secondly, in June for Dan Forrest's Jubilate Deo under conductor Tracey S. Resseguie and once again with the New England Symphonic Ensemble.

In 2018, Sharon performed at the Metropolitan Opera as Sister Dolcina in Puccini's Suor Angelica. In 2019 Sharon performed at the National Arts Centre in Ottawa, singing Marcellina in Mozart's The Marriage of Figaro under conductor Alexander Shelley. She performed regularly in her hometown of Montreal with L'Orchestre Classique de Montréal under the late conductor Boris Brott.  In 2019, featuring restored violins previously owned by Holocaust victims and survivors, Sharon performed with L'Orchestre Métropolitain under Dutch conductor Vincent De Kort as part of the Violins of Hope concert. In October 2021, she performed the compositions of the late composer Pierre Mercure as a soloist for the New-York based Talea Ensemble at the DiMenna Center for Classical Music. Of Azrieli's excerpt, Noémie Chemali from BlogCritics wrote:"Dissidence by the late Canadian composer Pierre Mercure was next on the program with Sharon Azrieli as soprano soloist. I must say, this piece was a perfectly packaged little gem, short yet so full of contrasting emotions, keeping me on the edge of my chair throughout. This composition could not have been executed so perfectly without the poise of such an accomplished performer as Ms. Azrieli and the virtuosity of all of the players in the Talea Ensemble."In June 2022, Sharon performed with the musicians of the Orchestre Classique de Montréal under the baton of Geneviève Leclair for the Benefit Gala Celebrating the Life and Legacy of Maestro Boris Brott. In the following July, Sharon performed and taught a masterclass in Athens and Syros, Greece, for the sixteenth Festival of the Aegean. In August, Sharon toured five cities in South America with violinist Alexandre da Costa and the Orchestre Symphonique de Longueuil. Concerts were held in Bogota, Medellin, Porto Alegre, Rio de Janeiro and Sao Paulo.

Home In Canada 
Working alongside Editor-in-Chief Stephanie Whittaker & art director Randy Laybourne, Sharon took over the Montreal, Vancouver and Toronto magazine Montreal Home in 2016. As the publisher of the new incarnation of Home in Canada, Sharon wrote numerous articles on contemporary trends and influencers performing within the creative architectural ethos. She wrote articles about the Maison & Objet design show at the Paris Nord Villepinte Exhibition Centre and the architectural design of the Orient Jerusalem Hotel. Further, Azrieli conducted interviews with Moshe Safdie, Karim Rashid, Frank Gehry, Tiffany Pratt, Mike Holmes, Rita Brianski and Chaki. After four successful years, the last issue of Home in Canada was Published on Dec 1, 2020, during the COVID-19 pandemic. Despite the magazine no longer producing print copies, Dr. Azrieli continued to post her interviews on YouTube and other media streaming platforms.

The Azrieli Music Prizes 
Established by the Azrieli foundation in 2014, the Azrieli Music Prizes (AMP) was the brainchild of Dr. Sharon Azrieli. Initially, upon its creation, the AMP offered two prizes,"The Azrieli Prize for Jewish Music is awarded to a composer who has written the best new undiscovered work of Jewish music...The Azrieli Commission for Jewish Music is awarded to encourage composers to creatively and critically engage with the question, "What is Jewish music?" This prize is given to the composer who proposes a response to this question in the shape of a musical work that displays the utmost creativity, artistry, technical mastery and professional expertise."For the 2020 rendition of the gala, the foundation added a third prize for Canadian music, "The Azrieli Commission for Canadian Music is offered to a Canadian composer to create a new musical work that creatively and critically engages with the complexities of composing concert music in Canada today."

The inaugural AMP Gala Concert took place on October 19, 2016, and premiered the winning compositions by Brian Current and Wlad Marhulets. The AMP Jury Awarded the Azrieli Prize for Jewish Music to Marhulets for his concerto for Klezmer Clarinet. The jury awarded the Azrieli Commission for Jewish Music to Current's newly created work, The Seven Heavenly Halls. The Orchestre Symphonique de Montréal accompanied both compositions under Maestro Kent Nagano's baton, with clarinetist Andre Moisan joining the orchestra for Marhulets Klezmar Concerto. The Gala Concert also featured an opening performance of excerpts from Gustav Mahler's Rückert-Lieder, no 1. "Blicke mir Nicht in die Lieder!" and no 2. "Ich atmet'einen linden Duft" sung by Sharon Azrieli.

On October 15, 2018, the AMP Gala Concert occurred at Maison Symphonique de Montréal and featured world premiers by laureates Kelly-Marie Murphy and Avner Dorman. The jury awarded Kelly-Marie Murphy the Azrieli Commission for Jewish Music for her piece En el escuro es todo uno (In the Darkness All Is One). Under the baton of guest conductor, Yoav Talmi L'Orchestre Classique de Montréal performed Murphy's piece with harpist Erica Goodman and cellist Rachel Mercer. In addition, the AMP Jury awarded Avner Dorman the Azrieli Prize for Jewish Music for his composition Nigunim. Featuring Canadian violinist Lara St. John, L'Orchestre Classique de Montréal, and conductor Yoav Talmi performed Dorman's Nigunim. The concert also featured a performance from soprano soloist Sharon Azrieli who sang Canadian composer Srul Irving Glick's Seven Tableaux from the Song of Songs.

On October 22, 2020, Lorraine Vaillancourt conducted Le Nouvel Ensemble Moderne for the AMP Gala Concert and the compositions submitted by the laureates. Held in the Salle Bourgie at the Montreal Museum of Fine Arts and live-steamed globally, the concert featured world premieres by Keiko Devaux, Yotam Haber and Yitzhak Yedid. In addition to the laureates, the concert featured an arrangement of Québécois composer Pierre Mercure's Dissidence orchestrated by Jonathon Monro and sung by soprano soloist Sharon Azrieli. Keiko Devaux was awarded the Azrieli Commission for Canadian Music for her composition Arras, which was later awarded a Juno in 2021. Yotam Haber was awarded the Azrieli Commission for Jewish Music for his composition of Estro Poetico-armonico III, and Yitzhak Yedid was awarded the Azrieli Prize for Jewish Music for his Kadosh Kadosh and Cursed composition.

Under the Baton of Canadian conductor Alexander Bloch, the most recent AMP gala concert was held on October 20, 2022, at La Maison Symphonique with the Orchestre Métropolitain. The second edition of the Azrieli Commission for Canadian Music was awarded to Rita Ueda for her composition Birds Callin from the Canada in You. The Azrieli Commission for Jewish Music was awarded to Iman Habibi for his composition Shāhīn-nāmeh, based on texts by Judeo-Persian poet Shahin Shirazi. The Azrieli Prize for Jewish Music was awarded to Aharon Harlap for his piece, Out of the depths have I cried unto Thee, O Lord. Sharon Azrieli sang for Harlaps award-winning composition, accompanying a laureates piece for the first time at the AMP.

Discography

Roles performed

Sacred works

Orchestral works

Repertoire

Philanthropy 
Azrieli sits on the boards of directors for the National Arts Centre (NAC), McCord Museum, Canadian Vocal Arts Institute (CVAI), as well as for the Azrieli Foundation. Additionally she serves as President Emeritus for the Orchestre Classique de Montréal (OCM).

References

External links
 

Canadian operatic sopranos
Opera crossover singers
Jewish Canadian musicians
Jewish women singers
Musicians from Montreal
Living people
Year of birth missing (living people)
Vassar College alumni
Parsons School of Design alumni
Singers from New York City
Juilliard School alumni
Women hazzans
21st-century Canadian women singers